Aleksandr Mikhaiylovich Piskaryov (born 18 November 1949) is a Russian football player and manager.

Work history
Krasnaya Presnya Moscow (1980–83)
Kareda (1998–99)
FC Khimki Moscow (2000)
FC Dinamo Minsk (2000–01)
 Mostransgaz Gazoprovod (2000)
FC Vostok (2004)
FC Anzhi Makhachkala (2003)
MTZ-RIPO Minsk (2004)

Played for
Spartak Moscow (1971–75)
FC SKA Rostov-on-Don  (1976–77)
Lokomotiv Kaluga (1978)
Spartak Ryazan (1979)
Krasnaya Presnya Moscow (1980)

References

External links
 

1949 births
Living people
Soviet footballers
Association football forwards
Soviet Union under-21 international footballers
Soviet Top League players
FC Tekstilshchik Ivanovo players
FC Spartak Moscow players
FC SKA Rostov-on-Don players
FC Asmaral Moscow players
FC Lokomotiv Kaluga players
Soviet football managers
Russian football managers
Russian expatriate football managers
Expatriate football managers in Kazakhstan
Expatriate football managers in Belarus
Russian expatriate sportspeople in Kazakhstan
FC Asmaral Moscow managers
FC Anzhi Makhachkala managers
FC Khimki managers
FC Dinamo Minsk managers
FK Kareda Kaunas managers
FBK Kaunas managers
FC Spartak Moscow managers
FC Vostok managers
FC Partizan Minsk managers
FC Spartak Ryazan players
Sportspeople from Ivanovo